Sopuerta is a town and municipality located in the province of Biscay, in the Autonomous Community of Basque Country, northern  Spain.

Conquistador Francisco de Garay was born in the Garay tower in Sopuerta.

Neighborhoods 
Sopuerta is administratively divided into 12 neighborhoods or wards:
 Mercadillo (Sokortua)
 Alen
 Arenao
 Avellaneda
 Baluga(Boluaga)
 Olabarrieta
 Bezi
 Castaño
 Jarralta
 Las Muñecas
 Las Ribas
 Carral

Demography

References 

Municipalities in Biscay